Malek Baghi may refer to:
 Malek Baghi, Markazi, Iran
 Malek Baghi, Zanjan, Iran